Sultan Ibrahim ibni Almarhum Sultan Muhammad IV, (9 October 1897 – 9 July 1960) was the Sultan of Kelantan from 1944 to 1960.

He was born at Istana Balai Besar in Kota Bharu to Sultan Muhammad IV ibni Almarhum Sultan Muhammad III, Sultan of Kelantan and his wife, Sultanah Zainab binti Nik Wan Muhammad Amin. On 22 June 1911, his father appointed him "Tengku Sri Indra Mahkota Kelantan", becoming the heir apparent on 21 April 1921.

He served as deputy Judge of the High Court and later represented his brother in Singapore in 1942. On 21 June 1944, he succeeded upon the death of his brother, Sultan Ismail and was crowned Sultan at Istana Balai Besar four months later. In 1953, he attended the coronation of Queen Elizabeth II in London where he famously shared an open carriage in the rain with Queen Sālote Tupou III of Tonga.

He married six wives by which he had 13 sons and 14 daughters. Sultan Ibrahim died from a cerebral haemorrhage in Istana Sri Cemerlang, Kota Bahru, on 9 July 1960 aged 63 after a reign of 16 years, and was succeeded as Sultan by his third son, Sultan Yahya Petra.

Honours

Honours of Kelantan 
 Grand Master of the Royal Family Order of Kelantan (DK, 20 June 1944 – 9 July 1960).
 Grand Master of the Order of the Crown of Kelantan (20 June 1944 – 9 July 1960).
 Grand Master of the Order of the Life of the Crown of Kelantan (20 June 1944 – 9 July 1960).
 Grand Master of the Order of the Most Distinguished and Most Valiant Warrior (PYGP, 20 June 1944 – 9 July 1960).

Honour of Malaya 
  : Recipient of the Order of the Crown of the Realm (DMN, 31 August 1958).

Foreign Honours
  : Companion of the Order of St Michael and St George (CMG, 4 June 1934).
  : King George V Silver Jubilee Medal (6 May 1935).
  : King George VI Coronation Medal (12 May 1937).
  : Honorary Knight Commander of the Order of St Michael and St George (KCMG, 10 June 1948).
  : Queen Elizabeth II Coronation Medal (2 June 1953).

References

1897 births
1960 deaths
Ibrahim
People from Kota Bharu
Knights Commander of the Order of St Michael and St George
Ibrahim
Malaysian Muslims
Malaysian people of Malay descent
Recipients of the Order of the Crown of the Realm